Harry Kim may refer to:

 Harry Kim (Star Trek), a fictional character on the American television series Star Trek: Voyager
 Harry Kim (politician) (born 1939), first Korean-American mayor elected in the United States
 Harry Kim (musician), trumpeter, regular supporting musician for Phil Collins